A Delicious Collection is the first compilation album by Australian singer songwriter, Deni Hines. The album was released in June 2002.

A Delicious Collection was re-released in August 2004 under the title The Definitive Collection.

Track listings

Release history

References

External links
 Deni Hines "A Delicious Collection" at Discogs
 Deni Hines "The Definitive Collection" at Discogs

2002 compilation albums
Deni Hines albums
Compilation albums by Australian artists
Mushroom Records compilation albums